Disambiguation is the process of identifying which meaning of a word is used in context.

Disambiguation may also refer to:

Music

 Disambiguation (Pandelis Karayorgis and Mat Maneri album), a 2002 album by Pandelis Karayorgis and Mat Maneri
 Ø (Disambiguation), a 2010 album by Underoath

Other uses
 Ambiguity, an attribute of any concept, idea, statement or claim whose meaning, intention or interpretation cannot be definitively resolved
 Memory disambiguation, a set of microprocessor execution techniques
 Semantic disambiguation, the problem of resolving semantic ambiguity
 Sentence boundary disambiguation, the problem in natural language processing of deciding where sentences begin and end
 Syntactic disambiguation, the problem of resolving syntactic ambiguity

See also
Ambiguity (disambiguation)

 :Category:Disambiguation pages